Diana Abu-Jaber is an American author and a professor at Portland State University.

Early life and education
Abu-Jaber was born in Syracuse, New York. Her father was Jordanian with a Palestinian Jerusalemite mother; Diana's mother was American, descended from Irish and German roots. At the age of seven, she moved with her family for two years to Jordan. She received a BA in English and Creative Writing from the State University of New York at Oswego, an MA in English and Creative Writing from the University of Windsor, and a PhD in English and Creative Writing from Binghamton University. She divides her time between Miami and Portland.

Career
Abu-Jaber writes about Arab and Arab-American culture and identity, often using the culture of food and food production.

Her academic appointments include: Visiting Assistant Professor, English, Iowa State University (1990);
Assistant Professor, English, University of Oregon (1990–1995); and
Writer-in-Residence/Professor, English Department, Portland State University (1996–present).

Bibliography
Fiction
 Arabian Jazz (1993) - Oregon Book Award (1994)
 Crescent (2003) - PEN Center USA Award for Literary Fiction (1994), Twenty Noteworthy Novels of 2003 by The Christian Science Monitor
 Origin (2007)
 Birds Of Paradise (2011)
 Fencing with the King (2022)

Nonfiction/memoir
 The Language of Baklava (2005)
 Life Without a Recipe (2016)

Young Adult fiction
 Silverworld (2020)

Essays
 The Other Woman: Twenty-one Wives, Lovers, and Others Talk Openly About Sex, Deception, Love, and Betrayal includes "The Lost City of Love"

References

External links 

 "My Elizabeth," a short story by Diana Abu-Jaber
 Portland State Faculty Profile
 2011 radio interview (one hour) at The Bat Segundo Show

Living people
American people of Jordanian descent
Syracuse
University of Windsor alumni
University of Oregon faculty
Novelists from Oregon
20th-century American novelists
American women novelists
Portland State University faculty
21st-century American novelists
20th-century American women writers
21st-century American women writers
Binghamton University alumni
American Book Award winners
Novelists from New York (state)
American women non-fiction writers
20th-century American non-fiction writers
21st-century American non-fiction writers
Women autobiographers
Year of birth missing (living people)
American women academics